Super Mario Bros. (also known as Super Mario Bros.: The Movie) is a 1993 fantasy adventure film based on Nintendo's Super Mario video game series. The first feature-length live-action film based on a video game, it was directed by the husband-and-wife team of Rocky Morton and Annabel Jankel, written by Parker Bennett, Terry Runté, and Ed Solomon, and distributed by Buena Vista Pictures through Hollywood Pictures. It follows brothers Mario (Bob Hoskins) and Luigi (John Leguizamo) in their quest to rescue Princess Daisy (Samantha Mathis) from a dystopic parallel universe ruled by the ruthless King Koopa (Dennis Hopper).

Development began after producer Roland Joffé obtained the Mario film rights from Nintendo. Given free creative license by Nintendo, which believed the Mario brand was strong enough for experimentation, the screenwriters envisioned Super Mario Bros. as a subversive comedy influenced by Ghostbusters (1984) and The Wizard of Oz (1939). The setting was inspired by the game Super Mario World (1990) with elements drawn from fairy tales and contemporary American culture. The production innovated and introduced many filmmaking techniques now considered pivotal in the transition from practical to digital visual effects, including the use of Autodesk Flame. Filming took place from May to July 1992.

Released on May 28, 1993, Super Mario Bros. was a critical and commercial failure, grossing $38.9 million worldwide against a budget of $42–48 million. It received generally unfavourable reviews from critics, who criticized the plot, inconsistent tone, and lack of faithfulness to the source material, but praised the special effects, artistic direction, and cast performances. 

Despite appearing on several lists of the worst films ever made, Super Mario Bros. developed a cult following and has been described as a cult classic. In 2012, a webcomic sequel was produced in collaboration with Bennett. Super Mario Bros. remained the only live-action film based on a Nintendo game property until Pokémon: Detective Pikachu (2019), while another Mario film, The Super Mario Bros. Movie, is scheduled for release in 2023, produced by Universal Pictures through its Illumination animation division.

Plot

Following the impact of a meteorite into the Earth 65 million years ago, the universe is split into two parallel dimensions. Surviving dinosaurs escape into the new dimension, evolving into a humanoid race and founding the city of Dinohattan. In 1973, a large egg and a rock are left at a Catholic orphanage; the egg hatches into a human baby.

Twenty years later, Italian-American brothers Mario Mario and Luigi Mario working as plumbers in Brooklyn are close to being driven out of business by mafiosa Anthony Scapelli's construction company. Luigi meets Daisy, an NYU archaeology student who shows him she has been excavating for dinosaur bones under the Brooklyn Bridge. There, they witnesses Scapelli's men sabotaging it by leaving the water pipes open. Mario and Luigi fix it, but Iggy and Spike—henchmen and cousins of Koopa, the king of the other dimension—kidnap Daisy and the brothers pursue them through an interdimensional portal to Dinohattan.

Daisy learns she is descended from dinosaurs and the long-lost princess of the other dimension; her father was overthrown as king by Koopa and her mother, the queen, was the one who took her to Brooklyn. Iggy and Spike realize that they lost Daisy's rock, in fact a meteorite fragment that Koopa needs to merge the worlds, believing only Daisy can do so because of her royal heritage. Mario and Luigi rescue Daisy, aided by Toad, a good-natured guitarist who was devolved into a Goomba, a semi-humanoid dinosaur, as punishment for a protest.

Koopa's girlfriend Lena obtains the rock, but dies merging the worlds. The worlds separate when Mario, Luigi, and Daisy remove the fragment from the meteorite and Koopa pursues them. Mario and Luigi obtain devolution guns and use them to defeat Koopa by devolving him into primeval slime. Daisy's father is restored as king, and the citizens celebrate and immediately destroy anything with Koopa's likeness. Daisy decides to stay in Dinohattan and kisses Luigi goodbye as she opens the portal for him and Mario to return to Brooklyn.

Three weeks later, Daisy arrives at Mario and Luigi's apartment in Brooklyn and asks them to help her on a new mission.

Cast

Production

Development
The suggestion for a film based on Super Mario Bros. was first put forward by Roland Joffé during a script meeting at his production company Lightmotive. Joffé met the Nintendo of America president and Hiroshi Yamauchi's son-in law, Minoru Arakawa. He presented Arakawa with an initial draft of the script. One month after their meeting, Joffé went to Nintendo's headquarters in Kyoto to meet Hiroshi Yamauchi. He pitched to Yamauchi the storyline which led to Nintendo receiving interest in the project. Joffé left with a $2 million contract giving the temporary control of the character of Mario over to Joffé. Nintendo retained merchandising rights for the film through a "creative partnership" with Lightmotive.

When Yamauchi asked Joffé why Nintendo should sell the rights to Lightmotive over a major company Joffé assured them that Nintendo would have more control over the film. However, Nintendo had no interest in creative control and believed the Mario brand was strong enough to allow an experiment with an outside industry. "I think they looked at the movie as some sort of strange creature that was kind of rather intriguing to see if we could walk or not", said Joffé. Joffé wondered, "How do we catch this wonderful mixture of images and inputs and strangeness?" The first screenplay was written by Oscar-winning screenwriter Barry Morrow. His story followed brothers Mario and Luigi on an existential road trip so similar to Morrow's prior Rain Man that production titled the script "Drain Man". Morrow described his screenplay as "a study in contrast, like Laurel and Hardy or Abbott and Costello", that would have "an odyssey and a quest" like the game itself. Co-producer Fred Caruso later said that Morrow's story was "more of a serious drama piece as opposed to a fun comedy".

Screenwriters Jim Jennewein and Tom S. Parker were brought on next to write a more traditional adaptation. "So right away we knew that the best way to do this is to essentially have a journey into this world, not unlike The Wizard of Oz", said Jennewein. His and Parker's take on the story was to subvert fairy tale clichés and satirize them, as well as focus on the relationship between Mario and Luigi. Jennewein said, "Essentially what we did was what Shrek did [...] And we knew the story had to be about the brothers and that the emotional through-line would be about the brothers." Greg Beeman of License to Drive was attached to direct and development had already moved into pre-production, but the failure of Beeman's recent Mom and Dad Save the World led to his dismissal by nervous producers. Joffé then offered Harold Ramis the director position, but though he was a fan of the video game, Ramis declined the opportunity, which he would later reflect being "glad" about and which the Associated Press would observe was his "smartest career decision".

Joffé said, "We tried some various avenues that didn't work, that came up too medieval or somehow wasn't the right thing. I felt the project was taking a wrong turn [...] And that's when I began thinking of Max Headroom." Joffé traveled to Rome to meet with creators Rocky Morton and Annabel Jankel. Morton said, "We come from the Tim Burton school of filmmaking, because our background is in animation and comic books [...] So we started off basing everything in reality, and then tried to have fun and exaggerate it as much as possible." Joffé, Morton, and Jankel agreed their approach to adapting the video games should follow the darker tone popularized by the 1989 Batman and 1990 Teenage Mutant Ninja Turtles. Joffé said, "This wasn't Snow White and the Seven Dinosaurs [...] The dino world was dark. We didn't want to hold back." Morton described the film as a prequel to the video games that tells the "true story" behind Nintendo's inspiration. Joffé viewed the games as a "mixture of Japanese fairy tales and bits of modern America", and wanted to create a "slightly mythic vision of New York". Screenwriter Parker Bennett elaborated: "Our take on it was that Nintendo interpreted the events from our story and came up with the video game. We basically worked backwards." the film also took inspiration from Die Hard, Mad Max, and Blade Runner. 

The concept of a parallel universe inhabited by dinosaurs was inspired by Dinosaur Land from the recently released Super Mario World. Jankel envisioned the parallel dimension as "[...] a whole world with a reptile point-of-view, dominated by aggressive, primordial behavior and basic instincts", while Morton considered the ecological and technological consequences of a dinosaur society that holds fossil fuels sacred. Joffé noted, "It's a wonderful parody of New York and heavy industry [...] We call it the New Brutalism." Screenwriters Parker Bennett and Terry Runté were tasked with balancing comedy with a darker tone: Bennett said, "Ghostbusters was the model [...] We were aiming towards funny, but kind of weird and dark."

Despite working well with the directors, Bennett and Runté were dismissed by the producers for being too comedic and the British writing team of Dick Clement and Ian La Frenais were brought on to deliver a more adult and feminist tone. Princess Daisy and Lena's roles were expanded while Bertha, a black woman, was introduced. This script signed the main cast, finally convincing Bob Hoskins to take on the role of Mario. The film officially moved into pre-production. However, producers Joffé and Eberts feared the project had both skewed too far from the intended young adult/family audiences and had become too effects-heavy to film within budget, so without informing directors Morton and Jankel or the signed cast they hired screenwriters Ed Solomon and Ryan Rowe to provide a more family-friendly script with more restrained effects requirements. The script doctoring was partially motivated by Disney purchasing the film's distribution rights. The cast only discovered the new screenplay upon arriving in Wilmington, North Carolina.

Directors Morton and Jankel considered leaving the project but decided to stay after talking it over with each other and realizing that no other director could at that point come on and understand the material enough to properly adapt it. Morton and Jankel also felt they owed it to the cast/crew and believed they could reclaim their vision during production. Rowe returned home to work on another project, but Solomon remained for several weeks to provide additional rewrites. Without invitation, Bennett and Runté took a road trip to Wilmington whereupon they were immediately re-hired. They would remain through production to provide final rewrites, dialogue for ADR, and the dialogue for the expository animated dinosaur opening. The intelligent fungus was inspired by both the Mushroom Kingdom from the games and tabloid reports of a discovered gigantic fungus. Production Designer David Snyder recalled: "As each script developed the fungus was sort of a metaphor for the mushroom element in a Nintendo game." Joffé reflected, "For me a screenplay is never finished [...] You work a screenplay all the time. When you bring actors in a screenplay goes through another evolution. So you can say that rather like the fungus in the movie the screenplay constantly evolves."

Casting
After securing the rights to the film, Lightmotive went to work finding the casting for the characters. Initially, Dustin Hoffman expressed interest in portraying Mario. However, Arakawa did not believe that he was the right man for the role. Danny DeVito was offered both the role of Mario and the director's mantle. Arnold Schwarzenegger and Michael Keaton were both approached to play Koopa, but both turned down the role. Tom Hanks was considered for the role of Luigi, but a string of recent box-office failures dropped him from consideration. Actors Bob Hoskins and John Leguizamo were ultimately cast as Mario and Luigi.

Initially, Hoskins disliked the script and did not want to do another children's film: "I'd done Roger Rabbit. I'd done Hook. I didn't want to become like Dick Van Dyke." Hoskins wondered how he would prepare for the role, saying "I'm the right shape. I've got a mustache. I worked as a plumber's apprentice for about three weeks and set the plumber's boots on fire with a blowtorch." Producer Roland Joffé kept sending Hoskins new script revisions until finally, the actor agreed. Co-director Jankel said, "Bob was a no brainer [...] Unabashed shameless physical type casting. Bob was brilliant at assuming the character, in a slightly amplified way that would be in keeping with his supposed subsequent game iteration."

"What I liked about the script was the adventure and the action that was involved", said Leguizamo. He joked that "You always see a lot of Italians playing Latin people, like Al Pacino did in Scarface. Now it's our turn!" Jankel said, "John was a brilliant up and coming stand-up comic and actor [...] We went to see him at Second City, and we were 100% sold. He had a wonderful combination of empathy and irreverence but was entirely without guile. It was not specifically scripted to be cast with a Hispanic or Latino actor, but it made perfect sense that the Mario Bros. themselves should be this contemporary unconventional family, so the small unit of just two, couldn't be pegged as one thing or another." According to Mojo Nixon, he was cast in the role of Toad because the production wanted an actual musician for the character, but their first choice Tom Waits was unavailable. Nixon's agent pitched him to casting as a "third-rate Tom Waits—for half-price".

Filming
Several weeks before shooting was to begin, Disney purchased the distribution rights to the film and demanded significant rewrites. Morton said the final result was a script that was not at all like the script that he, Jankel, and the cast had signed on to film, and that the tone of the new script was not at all compatible with the sets, which had already been built. Leguizamo said, "It's eight-year-olds who play the game and that's where the movie needed to be aimed. [...] But [the directors] kept trying to insert new material. They shot scenes with strippers and with other sexually-explicit content, which all got edited out anyway."

Principal photography of the film began on May 6, 1992, and wrapped on July 27, 1992. Contrary to many reports, directors Morton and Jankel did complete the contracted shooting of the film, though Director of Photography Dean Semler and several second unit directors provided additional reshoots. Morton and Jankel would even provide such instructions as what aperture the camera had to be at, to which Semler responded by questioning his employment on the production. Morton said, "I was locked out of the editing room [...] I had to get the DGA to come and help me get back into the editing room. I tried to get the editor to cut it digitally, but they refused. They wanted to edit on Moviola and Steenbeck machines, so the process was laboriously slow, which didn't help us get the special effect cut in on time."

Production design
Production Designer David Snyder approached turning the Mushroom Kingdom into the live-action setting of Dinohattan (also known as DinoYawk or Koopaville) by "[taking] all the elements that are in the video game" and "[turning] them into a metaphor and [combining] them with 3-D and real characters". "Koopa gets a single glimpse of Manhattan at the beginning of the movie", according to Art Director Walter P. Martishius. This inspires Koopa to recreate Dinohattan, but "he didn't get it quite right. The place is twisted, off balance, different. And he doesn't even know it."

Co-producer Fred Caruso located the deserted Ideal Cement Co. plant in Wilmington, North Carolina. Snyder found the location a unique opportunity: "In this building, with all the existing concrete structure, we could hang the scenery from the structure, and not have to build scaffolding, and could integrate the concrete structure into the film's design." Snyder said: "In Blade Runner (a film he was the Art Director on), the street was one level. Here I have a street level, a pedestrian walkway and above that Koopa's Room, plus six or seven stories in height. I have more flexibility in layering of levels. It's a major, major opportunity. You'd never be able to do this on a sound stage. There isn't a sound stage big enough." "We've designed this film with the idea of looking at New York while on some mind-altering drugs." The intelligent fungus was created from a fishing lure base and hot glue by prop designer Simon Murton.

Creatures effects
Lead creatures designer and supervisor Patrick Tatopoulos was aware of the concurrent Jurassic Park production, so he consciously designed the dinosaurs for Super Mario Bros. to be more cute and cartoon-like with inspiration from Beetlejuice. Tatopoulos described Yoshi as "an abstract, fantasy T. rex", and designed the baby dinosaur with large eyes to evoke a softer and less menacing quality. Lead SFX sculptor Mark Maitre compared Yoshi to a cross between "a Tyrannosaurus Rex and an iguana". Four versions of the Yoshi puppet were built: a stand-in, a wireless model, a half-puppet for the tongue, and a fully functional model. The fully functional puppet utilized 70 cables and nine operators, costing . Producers from Jurassic Park visited the set and were so impressed with the Yoshi puppet they briefly considered hiring its engineers for a second Jurassic Park creatures shop. Originally, the Goombas were only background characters, but their final designs were so impressive that directors Morton and Jankel promoted them to main characters with major stunts.

Visual effects
Super Mario Bros. innovated and introduced many techniques considered pivotal in the transition from practical to digital visual effects. It is the first film to have used the software Autodesk Flame, now an industry standard. It is also the first film scanned with a digital intermediate, allowing for the compositing of more than 700 visual effects shots. The disintegration effect for the inter-dimensional merge was inspired by the Transporter from Star Trek.

Reception

Box office
The film grossed  in the United States and Canada, selling approximately  tickets in the United States. In Asia, the film earned  from distribution rentals in Japan, and sold 106,083 tickets in the South Korean capital of Seoul City. In Europe, the film grossed  in the United Kingdom, sold 391,800 tickets in France, and sold 290,098 tickets in Germany. In total, the film grossed $17,997,000 internationally for a worldwide total of $38,912,465.

Critical response
The site's consensus states: "Despite flashy sets and special effects, Super Mario Bros. is too light on story and substance to be anything more than a novelty." Metacritic, which uses a weighted average, assigned a score of 35 out of 100 based on 23 critics, indicating "generally unfavorable reviews". Audiences surveyed by CinemaScore gave the film a grade of "B+" on scale of A+ to F.

Michael Wilmington of the Los Angeles Times said "It's a movie split in two: wildly accomplished on one level, wildly deficient on another." He gave the film high marks for its effects and the "sheer density and bravura of the production design", but ultimately provided a low final score for poor writing. Janet Maslin of The New York Times also commended the film's visual effects, and suggested Bob Hoskins could "handle any role with grace and good humor", but concluded "it doesn't have the jaunty hop-and-zap spirit of the Nintendo video game from which it takes – ahem – its inspiration". "The movie's no stinker", asserted Mark Caro of the Chicago Tribune, who lauded Hoskins and Leguizamo for their brotherly dynamic and called the Goombas "wonderfully daffy supporting characters". Hal Hinson of The Washington Post likewise praised the film for its performances and creatures effects, and proclaimed "In short, it's a blast."

Gene Siskel of the Chicago Tribune and Roger Ebert of the Chicago Sun-Times gave the film two thumbs down on the television program Siskel & Ebert At the Movies, citing tonal inconsistency and lack of narrative, and the film was on their list for one of the worst films of 1993. Stephen Hunter of The Baltimore Sun thought Yoshi had "more personality than all the human actors put together". Hal Hinson of The Washington Post declared the Goombas "the best movie heavies since the flying monkeys in The Wizard of Oz."

Accolades
Super Mario Bros. was one of four Disney films under consideration for the Best Visual Effects award at the 66th Academy Awards, though the academy ultimately nominated The Nightmare Before Christmas.

Home media
The film was first released on VHS in 1994 and on DVD in the United States in 2003 and again in 2010. The quality of the DVD release was widely derided for being non-anamorphic and only English Dolby Digital 5.1. The film was released on Blu-ray by Second Sight Films in the United Kingdom on November 3, 2014. The film was re-released as a limited edition Blu-ray steelbook by Zavvi in the UK in February 2017. The film was released on Blu-ray in Japan on December 22, 2017, which featured the same features and extras as Second Sight Films' release. An Australian Blu-ray release by Umbrella Entertainment was released in October 2021, featuring the same bonus features as Second Sight's release, plus the film's original workprint including deleted scenes. Despite the distributors labeling it as a Region B copy, it is also the first region-free Blu-ray release of the film, and it can be played on systems from any region. , fan website Super Mario Bros.: The Movie Archive is working with original VFX Supervisor Christopher F. Woods on a 4K resolution transfer and restoration for a future Region A release.

Legacy
In a 2007 interview, Hoskins said "The worst thing I ever did? Super Mario Brothers. It was a fuckin' nightmare. The whole experience was a nightmare. It had a husband-and-wife team directing, whose arrogance had been mistaken for talent. After so many weeks their own agent told them to get off the set! Fuckin' nightmare. Fuckin' idiots." He and Leguizamo would get drunk before each day of filming and would continue to drink between takes. In a 2011 interview, he was asked, "What is the worst job you've done?", "What has been your biggest disappointment?", and "If you could edit your past, what would you change?" His answer to all three was Super Mario Bros. His son, Jack Hoskins, is a fan of the film and praised his performance.

Leguizamo prepared a video message for the film's 20th anniversary in 2013, saying "I'm glad people appreciate the movie [...] it was the first, nobody had ever done it before [...] I'm proud of the movie in retrospect." Hopper disparaged the production, recounting in 2008: "It was a nightmare, very honestly, that movie. It was a husband-and-wife directing team who were both control freaks and wouldn't talk before they made decisions. Anyway, I was supposed to go down there for five weeks, and I was there for 17. It was so over budget." Furthermore, he added "I made a picture called Super Mario Bros., and my six-year-old son at the time - he's now 18 - he said, 'Dad I think you're probably a pretty good actor, but why did you play that terrible guy King Koopa in Super Mario Bros?' And I said, 'Well Henry, I did that so you could have shoes,' and he said, 'Dad, I don't need shoes that badly.'" Mathis said in 2018 for the film's 25th anniversary: "There are a lot of people who are really excited to meet me because I was Princess Daisy. That's all you can ask for as an actor—that your work, and something you were part of, left an impression on people and makes them feel good."

Co-director Morton reflected on the movie in 2016 as a "harrowing" experience. Morton felt "very uneasy" being put in the position of having to defend the new script. In addition, working with Dennis Hopper was "really, really hard. Really hard. I don't think [Hopper] had a clue what was going on." He described the experience as humiliating, but Morton was proud of the film's originality. Speaking with Game Informer for the film's 20th anniversary, Morton said: "I wanted parents to really get into it. At that time, there was a very hardcore movement against video games, and a lot of anti-video games sentiment. I wanted to make a film that would open it up and get parents interested in video games."

Co-director Jankel said, "I do feel in my heart, it was a hell of an achievement to have made it, under those circumstances, and it has in time, happily, achieved cult status [...] I am often hearing how many people loved it growing up, watch it repeatedly, and are genuine fans." Producer Joffé remains proud: "It's not that I defend the movie, it's just that, in its own extraordinary way, it was an interesting and rich artefact and has earned its place. It has strange cult status." Joffé never heard what Yamauchi or Nintendo thought of the finished product. He said, "They never phoned up to complain [...] They were very polite," though Nintendo of America President Reggie Fils-Aimé said in 2017 that the film "left a really bad taste in the mouth of our developers" and that he had heard "horror stories" about its production from Nintendo employees. Mario creator Shigeru Miyamoto said: "[In] the end, it was a very fun project that they put a lot of effort into [...] The one thing that I still have some regrets about is that the movie may have tried to get a little too close to what the Mario Bros. video games were. And in that sense, it became a movie that was about a video game, rather than being an entertaining movie in and of itself."

Cultural impact
Ryan Hoss, a longtime fan of the film, launched the fansite Super Mario Bros.: The Movie Archive in 2007, saying to Playboy for the film's 25th anniversary that "I had this collection, and the Internet was growing in terms of fansites during that era, the late '90s, and I always knew the Mario Bros. movie was misunderstood and a sore spot in people's minds—at least, the way it was being portrayed on the Internet, the 'worst movie ever' kind of deal." He characterized the site: "It's a way to celebrate the film itself and showcase the work of all the people who had a part in it—warts and all, good and bad."

In 2010 Steven Applebaum joined the site as editor-in-chief to help collect production materials and organize interviews. He said, "Most of the [cast and crew] were very happy about it because, at the time, it was a very revolutionary movie [...] They were introducing a lot of great special effects that hadn't been done before, and they had these really talented actors, and it was a project they were proud to work on. [...] Giving them a chance to talk about everything they did, it really helped them to share what they contributed and what they felt was important to the industry." The film returned to theaters through fan efforts in 2012, and in 2013 for the 20th anniversary. The Nintendo Power 20th anniversary retrospective issue states that the fact that the film was maderegardless of qualityshows how much the game series had impacted popular culture.

Themes
Thomas Leitch has written that Super Mario Bros. is an example of postliterary adaptation and that it "drops facetious references" to The Wizard of Oz, Star Wars, and Doctor Zhivago. Stephen Hunter of The Baltimore Sun compared the Goombas to the winged monkeys of The Wizard of Oz, suggesting they similarly evoke a "mix of pity and terror". The phrase "Trust the Fungus" from the film has been compared to "May the Force be with you" from Star Wars.

Sequel webcomic
In 2013, fansite editors Steven Applebaum and Ryan Hoss teamed with one of the film's original screenwriters, Parker Bennett, on a fanfiction webcomic sequel. Development on the sequel began after a 2010 interview in which Bennett admitted the sequel hook was more an homage to the ending of the original Back to the Future and was not a serious indication of a potential continuation. However, Applebaum and Hoss later asked Bennett what he would have done if given the opportunity and Bennett provided broad points about the consequences of the first film and the themes that they would have explored.

The adventure picks up with Mario and Luigi returning to Dinohattan to aid Daisy in defeating mad scientist Wart, the final boss from Super Mario Bros. 2. "We did heavily discuss the world of the film, from its backstory to the character's motivations", says Applebaum. Bennett provided general direction before "[passing] the torch" to Applebaum and Hoss.

Extended cut
On June 1, 2021, editor and film restorationist Garrett Gilchrist and members of The Super Mario Bros. (Movie) Archive released a "semi-official" restoration of the extended cut of Super Mario Bros. The restorationists dubbed it "The Morton-Jankel Cut," since it was based on an earlier VHS workprint of the film which had been discovered. Gilchrist was hired to get the most quality possible out of the low-quality VHS. The film is extended by twenty minutes in this cut, with additional scenes including Koopa devolving a technician into slime for the crime of sneezing, Mario's rivalry with the mafia-affiliated Scapelli plumbing company, and an anti-Koopa rap by Spike and Iggy at the Boom Boom Bar, backed up with scantily-clad lizard dancers. While the "Morton-Jankel Cut" was theoretically intended as an official Blu-ray extra, there are currently no plans for this to happen, and it was leaked to The Internet Archive instead. The Australian Blu-ray by Umbrella (released October 2021) uses a raw edit of the VHS workprint rather than Gilchrist's restoration.

Soundtrack

The soundtrack, released on May 10, 1993, by Capitol Records, featured two songs from Roxette: "Almost Unreal", which was released as a single, and "2 Cinnamon Street", which is an alternate version of the song "Cinnamon Street" from Roxette's album Tourism. The music video for "Almost Unreal" was inspired by the film, featuring scenes from the film and a de-evolution theme. "Almost Unreal" was originally written for the film Hocus Pocus, but was switched out to an En Vogue song instead. Roxette subsequently gave the song to the Mario film. Roxette co-founder Per Gessle said "the film turned out to be ridiculous (so thought Dennis Hopper by the way… I met him at a Formula 1 race many years ago discussing this…) but the song isn’t that bad". 

* These tracks were not included in the U.S. and Canada releases, only on the international versions of the album.

Animated film 

Rumors of a theatrical animated Mario film began in late 2014, with leaked emails between film producer Avi Arad and Sony Pictures head Tom Rothman suggesting that Sony would be producing the film. On November 14, 2017, Universal Pictures and Illumination announced they will release a computer-animated Mario film. On January 31, 2018, Nintendo of America announced its partnership with Illumination, stating that the film will be co-produced by Shigeru Miyamoto and Chris Meledandri. On November 6, 2018, Meledandri stated that the film will be a "priority" for the studio, with a tentative 2022 release date, while reaffirming that Miyamoto will be involved "front and center" in the film's creation. Speaking of the challenge of adapting the series into an animated film, Meledandri stated the film would be "an ambitious task...taking things that are so thin in their original form and finding depth that doesn't compromise what generations of fans love about Mario, but also feels organic to the iconography and can support a three-act structure." On January 31, 2020, Nintendo stated that the film is "moving along smoothly" for release in 2022. Nintendo owns the rights to the film, and both Nintendo and Universal funded production.

The first teaser trailer for the film was revealed live in a Nintendo Direct presentation. The film is currently slated for a North American release on April 5, 2023.

See also
 List of films based on video games
 List of films considered the worst

References
  Text in this article was copied from Super Mario Bros. (film) at the Super Mario wiki, which is released under a Creative Commons Attribution-Share Alike 3.0 (Unported) (CC-BY-SA 3.0) license.

External links 

 
 Super Mario Bros. The Movie Archive

1990s adventure films
1990s buddy comedy films
1990s dystopian films
1990s fantasy adventure films
American buddy comedy films
American dystopian films
American fantasy adventure films
British buddy comedy films
Cinergi Pictures films
Fiction portraying humans as aliens
Films about brothers
Films about dinosaurs
Films about orphans
Films about parallel universes
Puppet films
Films scored by Alan Silvestri
Films set in 1973
Films set in 1993
Films set in Brooklyn
Films set in New York City
Films shot in New York City
Films shot in North Carolina
Films with live action and animation
Films with screenplays by Ed Solomon
Hollywood Pictures films
Live-action films based on video games
Mario (franchise) films
Films directed by Annabel Jankel
Films directed by Rocky Morton
1990s English-language films
1990s American films
1990s British films